Hilbert van der Duim (born 4 August 1957) is a Dutch former speed skater. A two-time world and European champion, Van der Duim "won often but also fell often", and has become famous for some of the incidents that happened to him during his career.

Career
Hilbert van der Duim became World Allround Champion in 1980, was the first skater in four years to beat Eric Heiden in international competition. He became World Allround Champion again in 1982. He also was European Allround Champion twice (in 1983 and 1984) and became Dutch Allround Champion a record number of seven times, winning seven consecutive national Allround titles in the years 1979-1985.

He participated in the Winter Olympics, twice (in 1980 and 1984), but his highest finish was fourth place in the 5,000 meters in 1980 in Lake Placid. In 1986, Van der Duim switched to marathon skating and impressed by his high skating speed. On 28 November 1986, he became World Hour Record holder, skating 39,492.80 metres in one hour. He was forced to end his skating career when he was involved in a severe automobile accident in 1987, driving home after a marathon.

Van der Duim was of the last generation of skaters before the commercialization of the sport in the Netherlands; the Dutch skating league had such strict rules against advertising, for instance, that Van der Duim was threatened with expulsion after he appeared on television with the name of a sponsor on his hat. After his skating career, Van der Duim became a teacher, teaching economics at Drenthe College, and in the late 1990s he was also active in local politics, taking a seat on the city council of Assen for a populist party.

Incidents
Van der Duim gained fame as a colourful skater because of several incidents. At the European Allround Championships in 1981, he fell on the 10,000 m and finished this distance in a time of 15:28.53 (for comparison: during the European Championships the year before, he had skated a time of 15:06.29). His fall probably cost him the title – he won European Allround silver 0.728 points (equivalent to 14.56 seconds on the 10,000 m) behind Amund Sjøbrend. After his 10,000 m race, Van der Duim explained that skating over "bird poop" had made him fall, causing widespread speculation in the Dutch popular press over the nature of the bird. Later, Van der Duim admitted there had been no excrement, but the episode has come to stand for any unexplained failure in Dutch sports.

On the 5,000 m at the World Allround Championships that same year, he sprinted to the finish line one lap too soon and it took him some time to understand what people were trying to tell him – that he had one more lap to go. His chances to successfully defend his World Allround Championships title were ruined when he fell on the 1,500 m the next day.

At the 1983 World Allround Championships in Oslo, Van der Duim was still the reigning World Allround Champion, and he made his appearance in a "rainbow speed skating suit", a white suit with coloured stripes, influenced by the rainbow jersey used by reigning World Champions in bicycle racing. After an excellent 500 m race, he finished only 17th on the 5,000 m and therefore did not qualify for the final distance, the 10,000 m. After his disastrous 5,000 m race, Van der Duim declared that he had "porridge in his legs".

Personal records

Source: www.isu.org

Van der Duim has an Adelskalender score of 162.253 points. His highest ranking on the Adelskalender was a 3rd place.

World records

source:

Tournament overview

DNQ = Did not qualify for the last distance
NC = No classification
source:

Medals won

References

External links
 
 
 
 
 

1957 births
Living people
People from Opsterland
Dutch male speed skaters
Olympic speed skaters of the Netherlands
Speed skaters at the 1980 Winter Olympics
Speed skaters at the 1984 Winter Olympics
World Allround Speed Skating Championships medalists
World Sprint Speed Skating Championships medalists
Sportspeople from Friesland